Ahmad Fuadi (born 30 December 1973) is an Indonesian writer, novelist and social entrepreneur.  His debut novel Negeri 5 Menara (The Land of 5 Towers) broke the publisher's sales record (Gramedia Pustaka Utama) for the last 37 years. Negeri 5 Menara is the first part of the Negeri 5 Menara trilogy, followed by Ranah 3 Warna (The Earth of 3 Colors), and Rantau 1 Muara"  "Negeri 5 Menara" was brought into wide-screen version and listed as one of the most watched Indonesian movies in the year of 2012. He's also well known for his extraordinary achievement in achieving 9 overseas scholarships.

Education & Work 
One of Fuadi's life-changing experience was his experience during his study in Pondok Modern Darussalam Gontor, where he was introduced to a powerful mantra "Man Jadda Wajada" (He who gives his all will surely succeed) in his first day. He then went to Padjajaran University, majoring International Relations. During his last semester in Padjadjaran University, he got a scholarship from the National University of Singapore and spent a semester there. Upon graduating with a degree in International Relations from Padjadjaran University, he became a journalist for Tempo magazine. His first class in journalism was done in reporting assignments under the guidance of senior Tempo journalists. In 1999, he received a Fulbright scholarship to take his master's degree at the School of Media and Public Affairs, George Washington University, USA. Venturing to Washington, D.C. together with Yayi, his wife—also a Tempo journalist—was a childhood dream come true. While studying, they were also Tempo correspondents and reporters for Voice of America (VOA). They reported on historical news, such as the 9-11 tragedy, straight from the Pentagon, White House, and Capitol Hill. In 2004, another world window opened when he received the Chevening Award scholarship to study documentary films at Royal Holloway, University of London. As a scholarship hunter, Fuadi is always enthusiastic to continue his education and find more scholarships. He has had opportunities to live and study in Canada, Singapore, USA, and the UK.

Achievements 
Some of the Indonesian media attribute him as "the dream achiever" due to his remarkable achievements: 
 International Education Program, CWY, Montreal, Canada, 1995 – 1996
 SIF-ASEAN Visiting Student Fellowship, National University of Singapore, 1997
 Indonesian Cultural Foundation Inc Award, 2000 – 2001
 Columbian College of Arts and Sciences Award, The George Washington University, 2000 – 2001 The Ford Foundation Award 1999–2000
 CASE Media Fellowship, University of Maryland, College Park, 2002 
 Fulbright Scholarship, MA in Media and Public Affairs, The George Washington University, Washington DC, 1999–2001
 British Chevening Scholarship, MA in Media Arts, Royal Holloway, University of London, UK, 2004 – 2005
 Khatulistiwa Literary Award 2010, Long List
 The Most Favorite Fiction Writer of the Year, Indonesian Readers Award 2010
 The Best Fiction Novel & The Best Fiction Writer, awarded by the National Library of the Republic of Indonesia, 2011
 Liputan 6 Award SCTV for the Education & Motivation Category, 2011
 Resident Writer, Lake Como – Italy, awarded by the Rockefeller Foundation, 2012
 The National Intellectual Property Rights Award, for the Novel Category, awarded by the Directorate Generale of Intellectual Property Rights, 2013
 Artist in Residence, University of California, Berkeley, USA, 2014

International Events 

 Frankfurt Book Fair, Germany, 2012
 Singapore Writers Festival, Singapore, 2012
 Makassar International Writers Festival, Indonesia, 2012
 Kuala Lumpur International Book Fair, Malaysia, 2011
 Ubud Writers Festival, Indonesia, 2011

Social Works  
With his wife Danya "Yayi" Dewanti, Fuadi founded Komunitas Menara, a volunteer-based social organization which aims to provide free schools, libraries, clinics and soup kitchens for the less fortunate. Up until now, Komunitas Menara has already built 5 free pre-schools throughout Indonesia.

Bibliography

Novels 
 Negeri 5 Menara (Gramedia Pustaka Utama, 2009), translated to Bahasa Melayu (PTS Litera) & English (Gramedia Pustaka Utama)
 Ranah 3 Warna (Gramedia Pustaka Utama, 2011), translated to Bahasa Melayu (PTS Litera) & English (on going)
 Rantau 1 Muara (Gramedia Pustaka Utama, April 2013)

Man Jadda Wajada Series 
 Man Jadda Wajada 1: Berjalan Menembus Batas (Bentang Pustaka, 2012)
 Man Jadda Wajada 2: Menjadi Guru Inspiratif (Bentang Pustaka, 2012)

Others 
 Rahasia Penulis Hebat: Menciptakan Karakter Tokoh (co-writer) (Gramedia Pustaka Utama, 2010)
 Dari Datuk ke Sakura Emas (co-writer) (Bentang Pustaka, 2011)
 Rindu Purnama (co-writer) (Bentang Pustaka, 2011)

References

External links 

  Ahmad Fuadi in The Jakarta Post
  Ahmad Fuadi in The Jakarta Globe
  Ahmad Fuadi in books.google.com
  The Land of Five Towers in Amazon
  Ahmad Fuadi's Profile in US Embassy Jakarta Website
  Negeri 5 Menara the Movie in IMDb
  Negeri 5 Menara Website 
  Ahmad Fuadi's Biography in gramedia
  Ahmad Fuadi's profile in Goodreads
  TNC & Ahmad Fuadi in asianview.com
  Fuadi's photography works
  Ahmad Fuadi in Kick Andy

Living people
1973 births
Padjadjaran University alumni
National University of Singapore alumni
George Washington University School of Media and Public Affairs alumni
Alumni of Royal Holloway, University of London
Chevening Scholars